Selenia Iacchelli (born 5 June 1986) is a Canadian soccer player who played as a midfielder.

International career
She represented Canada at the 2004 FIFA U-19 Women's World Championship and 2006 FIFA U-20 Women's World Championship. After a series of injuries she made her debut for the senior Canadian team at the age of 27 in November 2013, in a 0–0 draw with Mexico.

Club career
Iacchelli's move to Western New York Flash collapsed in April 2014 when she failed the medical. A year earlier she had agreed a move to Doncaster Rovers Belles of the English FA WSL, but broke her arm.

Career statistics

Personal life
Iacchelli and Canadian teammate Emily Zurrer operate a food truck business which sells frozen yoghurt and Belgian waffles.

References

External links
 
 
 
 Selenia Iachelli at Football.it

Living people
1986 births
Canadian people of Italian descent
Canadian women's soccer players
Canada women's international soccer players
Women's association football forwards
Vancouver Whitecaps FC (women) players
Torres Calcio Femminile players
Serie A (women's football) players
2015 FIFA Women's World Cup players
Soccer players from Edmonton
Nebraska Cornhuskers women's soccer players
21st-century Canadian women